Prison Act (with its variations) is a stock short title used in Malaysia and the United Kingdom for legislation relating to prisons.

List

Malaysia
The Prison Act 1995

United Kingdom
The Prison (Escape) Act 1706 (1 Ann c 1)
The Prison (Escape) Act 1742 (16 Geo 2 c 31)
The Prison Ministers Act 1863 (26 & 27 Vict c 79)
The Central Criminal Court (Prisons) Act 1881 (44 & 45 Vict c 64)
The Prison Act 1898 (61 & 62 Vict c 41)
The Prison Act 1952 (15 & 16 Geo 6 & 1 Eliz 2 c 52)
The Prisons (Scotland) Act 1952 (15 & 16 Geo 6 & 1 Eliz 2 c 61)
The Prisons (Scotland) Act 1989 (c 45)
The Prison Security Act 1992 (c 25)
The Prisons (Alcohol Testing) Act 1997 (c 38)

Act of the Parliament of Northern Ireland
The Prison Act (Northern Ireland) 1953 (c 18) (NI)

Northern Ireland Order in Council
The Prison (Amendment) (Northern Ireland) Order 2004 (SI 2004/704) (NI 7)

The Prison Acts 1865 to 1893 was the collective title of the following Acts:
The Prison Act 1865 (28 & 29 Vict c 126)
The Prison Officers Compensation Act 1868 (31 & 32 Vict c 21)
The Prison Act 1877 (40 & 41 Vict c 21)
The Prison (Officers Superannuation) Act 1878 (41 & 42 Vict c 63)
The Prison Act 1884 (47 & 48 Vict c 51)
The Prison (Officers Superannuation) Act 1886 (49 & 50 Vict c 9)
The Prison (Officers Superannuation) Act 1893 (56 & 57 Vict c 26)

The Prisons (Scotland) Acts 1860 to 1887 was the collective title of the following Acts:
The Prisons (Scotland) Act 1860 (23 & 24 Vict c 105)
The Lanark Prisons Act 1868 (31 & 32 Vict c 50)
The Prisons (Scotland) Act 1877 (40 & 41 Vict c 53)
The Prisons Officers Superannuation (Scotland) Act 1887 (50 & 51 Vict c 60)

The Prisons (Ireland) Acts 1826 to 1884 was the collective title of the following Acts:
The Prisons (Ireland) Act 1826 (7 Geo 4 c 74)
The Prisons (Ireland) Act 1840 (3 & 4 Vict c 44)
The Prisons (Ireland) Act 1856 (19 & 20 Vict c 68)
The Prison Officers Superannuation (Ireland) Act 1873 (36 & 37 Vict c 51)
The General Prisons (Ireland) Act 1877 (40 & 41 Vict c 49)
The Prison Service (Ireland) Act 1883 (46 & 47 Vict c 25)
The Prisons (Ireland) Amendment Act 1884 (47 7 48 Vict c 36)

See also
List of short titles

References

Lists of legislation by short title and collective title